is a 2022 Japanese animated romantic comedy film based on The Quintessential Quintuplets manga series by Negi Haruba and a sequel to the anime television series The Quintessential Quintuplets (2019–2021). Produced by Bibury Animation Studios and distributed by Pony Canyon, the film is directed by Masato Jinbo from a script written by Keiichirō Ōchi and stars Yoshitsugu Matsuoka, Kana Hanazawa, Ayana Taketatsu, Miku Itō, Ayane Sakura, and Inori Minase. In the film, Futaro Uesugi plans to confess his love to one of the Nakano quintuplets during their final school festival.

A continuation of the anime series was announced in March 2021, followed by the confirmation of the project as a film in April. The cast and staff for the film were revealed in October and December 2021, respectively.

The Quintessential Quintuplets Movie was released in Japan on May 20, 2022. The film has grossed over million worldwide and received nominations at the Newtype Anime Awards.

Plot

Following their summer vacation, Futaro Uesugi and the Nakano quintuplets Ichika, Nino, Miku, Yotsuba, and Itsuki, now third-year high school students, prepare for the upcoming school festival. On the day of the festival, Futaro invites the quintuplets to a room and confesses his love to them, but he tells them to wait until the end of the festival to know whom he has chosen among them. During her acting work on the second day of the festival, Ichika learns that one of her sisters has collapsed and rushes to a hospital, where she sees Futaro and Nino visiting. Ichika strolls outside with Futaro, during which she kisses him at a park. On the second day of the festival, Nino is expecting the quintuplets' father Maruo to visit the school but is unable to find him among the crowd. She is approached by Futaro with a video confirming her father's attendance. Nino and Futaro visit her father in the hospital, where she cooks a pancake for him. After the successful meeting, Nino kisses Futaro and thanks her father for choosing him as the quintuplets' tutor.

On the first day of the festival, Miku is accompanied by Futaro in approaching the boys' takoyaki stand, where she promises that the girls supporting the pancake stand are going to enjoy their food. Later, Miku returns to the stand with the girls but finds the place on fire. On the third day of the festival, Miku invites Futaro to a rooftop, where they find two of their classmates arguing about the takoyaki stand incident. After reprimanding her classmates, Miku confronts Futaro out of jealousy from his meeting with an unknown girl yesterday and kisses him. Since the start of the festival, Yotsuba is overworking in helping different clubs. On the second day of the festival, she collapses due to exhaustion. While in a hospital, Yotsuba learns from Futaro that some of the students she has helped before offered their assistance during her absence. On the third day of the festival, Yotsuba kisses a resting Futaro. Itsuki is studying on the first day of the festival when her teacher Mudō reveals his history with her mother. The following day, she learns that Mudō is the quintuplets' biological father and gets angry at him for leaving her mother alone when she was pregnant. On the third day of the festival, Futaro visits Itsuki in the house and motivates her to keep on following her dream as a teacher. Later, Maruo, Futaro's father Isanari, and Miku dressing as Itsuki meet with Mudō. Itsuki then tells Mudō that he is not suitable to be the quintuplets' father after failing to see through Miku's disguise.

At the end of the festival, the quintuplets advise Futaro to approach one of them, currently separated from each other in a building, as his way of confession. Futaro meets with Yotsuba and confesses his love, but she rejects him as she sees herself as unfit for him. As she runs away from him, Yotsuba recalls her first meeting with Futaro and the promise they made to each other. In the end, Futaro catches up to her and manages to convince her to confess her true feelings toward him. Yotsuba decides to address the feelings of her sisters first before dating Futaro. After reconciling with her sisters, Yotsuba begins dating Futaro, during which he suddenly proposes to her for marriage at the park with a swing they visited before. Five years later, Nino and Miku, now owners of a cafe, reunite with Ichika, an actress, Itsuki, a teacher, and Yotsuba, who is about to get married. As a wedding gift, Yotsuba's ears get pierced to wear her mother's earrings. On the day of the wedding, the quintuplets play their final game to Futaro, in which he needs to guess who is the bride among them, but he instead identifies them one by one. After the success of the wedding, the quintuplets discuss the best country for the newlywed's honeymoon.

Voice cast

Production
The staff of the second season of The Quintessential Quintuplets revealed in March 2021 that the production on a sequel had begun. The sequel was confirmed to be a film in April 2021. It would serve as the finale for the anime series, adapting the final four volumes of The Quintessential Quintuplets manga series by Negi Haruba. Pony Canyon was revealed as the film's distributor in October 2021, with Yoshitsugu Matsuoka, Kana Hanazawa, Ayana Taketatsu, Miku Itō, Ayane Sakura, and Inori Minase reprising their respective voice roles as Futaro Uesugi and the Nakano quintuplets Ichika, Nino, Miku, Yotsuba, and Itsuki from the anime series. In December 2021, Masato Jinbo was revealed as the director, Keiichirō Ōchi as the screenwriter, Masato Katsumata as the character designer, Akihito Ougiyama as the art director, Aiko Matsuyama as the color designer, Daisuke Chiba as the cinematographer, and Mutsumi Takemiya as the editor of the film at Bibury Animation Studios. In October 2022, Crunchyroll revealed the English dub cast for the film.

Music
Hanae Nakamura and Miki Sakurai were confirmed to be composing The Quintessential Quintuplets Movie in December 2021. The Nakano Family Quintuplets, comprising the voice actresses of the quintuplets, performed the film's theme music  and the ending theme music . The original soundtrack and the CD , which features the two theme music and the insert song , were released in Japan by Anchor Records and Pony Canyon, respectively, on May 25, 2022.

Marketing
A trailer announcing the production for the sequel of The Quintessential Quintuplets anime series and a teaser visual were released in March 2021. The first key visual for The Quintessential Quintuplets Movie was published in October 2021. The film received its first trailer and the second key visual in December 2021. In February 2022, Mages announced a video game based on the film titled , which was released in Japan on PlayStation 4 and Nintendo Switch on June 2. In March 2022, Weiß Schwarz announced a new set of  collectible cards based on the film for a September 9 release in Japan, but it was moved to September 16. The third key visual and the second trailer for the film were released in March 2022. Volume 14.5 of the manga series, which includes a bonus chapter taking place after the events of the original ending, was announced in April 2022 as a gift for moviegoers on the film's premiere.

Release

Theatrical

The Quintessential Quintuplets Movie was released in 108 theaters in Japan on May 20, 2022, with 91 theaters added on July 29. At the Odex Film Festival, Odex screened the film in Singapore on September 2–4, 2022, and in Malaysia on September 3–4 and 10–11. Crunchyroll began screening the film internationally (excluding Asia and the Middle East) on October 31, 2022, first releasing at Lucca Comics and Games in Lucca, Italy. They released it in Australia and New Zealand on December 1, 2022, in the United States and Canada on December 2, and in the United Kingdom and Ireland, through Sony Pictures Releasing, on December 7.

Home media
The Quintessential Quintuplets Movie became available for rent through streaming services in Japan on October 21, 2022. The film was released on Blu-ray and DVD in Japan on December 21, 2022. They include the colorized version of "Volume 0" of The Quintessential Quintuplets manga series.

Reception

Box office
, The Quintessential Quintuplets Movie grossed million in Japan and million in other territories, for a worldwide total of million. The film is the thirteenth highest-grossing anime film and the twentieth-overall highest-grossing film of 2022 in Japan.

The film grossed million (million) in its opening weekend in Japan, ranking second at the box office. In its second weekend, the film earned million (million) and ranked down to the third place at the box office. The film reached the one-billion-yen mark at the box office after earning million (million) in its third weekend and ranked down to the fourth place. In the 26 days since the film's release, one million tickets were reported to have been sold. The film reached the two-billion-yen box office in its ninth weekend, becoming the fifth Japanese animated film of 2022 to do so.

Outside Japan, the film grossed  in its opening weekend in the United States and Canada. Deadline Hollywood noted the film was "not a crowd pleaser to its demo like previous titles from [Crunchyroll]", with its opening day earning  from 910 theaters. In the United Kingdom and Ireland, the film earned  from 108 theaters in its opening weekend.

Critical response
The review aggregator website Rotten Tomatoes reported a 91% approval rating, with an average score of 7.60/10, based on 11 reviews. The Japanese review and survey firm Filmarks reported the film had an approval rating of 4.15 out of 5, based on 520 reviews, placing it first in their first-day satisfaction ranking.

Phil Hoad at The Guardian gave The Quintessential Quintuplets Movie 4 out of 5 stars, stating that the film was "a fairly charming, if stridently sentimental and moralistic romantic fantasy that, with its clever structure, even manages to pick at the mysteries of identity." Hoad lauded how director Masato Jinbo depicted each of the quintuplets' individuality over the story's three-day school festival. Simon Abrams of TheWrap felt the film had "all of the melodramatic revelations and puppy-love intrigue of the preceding anime series", stating that "[i]f you like unabashedly corny teen romances, there's a fair chance that the sheer too-much-ness of The Quintessential Quintuplets Movie will appeal to you." Courtney Lanning of Northwest Arkansas Democrat Gazette felt the film was "cute, heartfelt and funny at times" and praised the "bouncy and colorful" art handled by Bibury Animation Studios. Daryl Harding of Crunchyroll praised the film for its animation, sound music, and production. Kim Morrissy of Anime News Network graded the film "B", feeling that the film did "an impressive job with the leadup, dangling the five options in a way that makes them all seem plausible without cheapening the eventual resolution." Richard Whittaker of The Austin Chronicle gave the film 3 out of 5 stars, feeling that it did "what it needs to do in not just making a choice, or making a choice that will please the biggest section of the audience and infuriate too many shippers, but in making a choice that makes sense."

Critics criticized the film's runtime and ending: Abrams felt that it "crams too much of everything into an oversized 136-minute special that mainly serves to wrap up the anime series' loose narrative threads"; Lanning believed that it "would have benefited from a little bit of trimming" and noted how the story at its conclusion "starts to drag"; Harding felt the ending was "rushed"; and Morrissy found the ending focusing on the quintuplets "ends up taking too much time."

Accolades
In December 2022, The Quintessential Quintuplets Movie placed eleventh among the top 20 Japanese animated films voted by fans to win the Anime of the Year at Tokyo Anime Award Festival 2023. That month, U-NEXT placed the film seventh on their list of the "Best 10 Most Popular Works in 2022" for the anime rental category, and Animate Times ranked it fourth on their poll for the top 20 animated films of 2022.

|-
! scope="row" rowspan="11" | 2022
| rowspan="10" | Newtype Anime Awards
| Best Picture (Film)
| The Quintessential Quintuplets Movie
| 
| rowspan="10" | 
|-
| Best Male Character
| Futaro Uesugi
| 
|-
| rowspan="2" | Best Female Character
| Yotsuba Nakano
| 
|-
| Ichika Nakano
| 
|-
| rowspan="2" | Best Theme Song
| "The Tracks of the Quintuplets" by the Nakano Family Quintuplets
| 
|-
| "The Quintessential Quintuplets: Thank You Flowers" by the Nakano Family Quintuplets
| 
|-
| Best Director
| Masato Jinbo
| 
|-
| Best Screenplay
| Keiichirō Ōchi
| 
|-
| Best Character Design
| Masato Katsumata
| 
|-
| Best Sound
| Hanae Nakamura, Miki Sakurai
| 
|-
| 
| Golden Gross Special Award
| The Quintessential Quintuplets Movie
| 
| 
|-

References

External links
 The Quintessential Quintuplets Movie at TBS Television 
  
 
 

2022 anime films
2022 romantic comedy films
Anime films based on manga
Bibury Animation Studios
Crunchyroll anime
Japanese animated films
Japanese romantic comedy films
Odex
Romantic comedy anime and manga